UASC may refer to:

Unaccompanied asylum-seeking children in the United Kingdom
Underwater Archaeological Society of Chicago
United Arab Shipping Company, merged with Hapag-Lloyd in April 2016.
Universal Avionics Systems Corporation aka Universal Avionics.